The Philippines men's national basketball team competed in the 2019 FIBA Basketball World Cup which was held in China from August 31 to September 15, 2019. This is the Philippines second straight appearance in the FIBA Basketball World Cup since its participation in the 2014 edition hosted in Spain.

The team during the Asian qualifiers was initially coached by Chot Reyes and, later, Yeng Guiao. The team's qualification bid suffered a setback when the team still coached by Reyes was involved in a brawl with Australia which led to the suspension of players and officials forcing the Philippines to change its roster for the subsequent qualifier games.

Timeline 
June 17: Training session begins
July 15: 19-man shortlist announced
August 25: Final 12-man roster announced
August 29: Arrival in China
August 31 – September 15: 2019 FIBA Basketball World Cup

Qualification

First round

Second round

Exhibition games
The schedule of the Philippine Basketball Association (PBA) season is one of the factors weighed in organizing exhibition games as preparation of the Philippine national team for the FIBA Basketball World Cup since majority of its players participate in the league. For this reason the Philippines' basketball federation, the Samahang Basketbol ng Pilipinas (SBP), decided against the team's participation in the 2019 William Jones Cup due to conflicting schedule with the PBA. A pocket national teams' tournament to be held in Metro Manila was planned.

Playing at least a match Australia was considered which was also intended as a goodwill measure to rebuild trust between the two national teams following the Philippines–Australia brawl. However, Australia informed their Philippine counterparts that their schedule is already full so a scrimmage is not possible prior to the 2019 FIBA World Cup. Exhibition matches was considered against South Korea and New Zealand.

The PBA Board also approved on April 25, 2019, a four-day training camp for the Philippine national team in Russia where they are expected to play games against local teams along with consenting their players to participate in twice-a-week practices in June and July. However, the Russian camp was cancelled after the Russian basketball federation could only commit one single tune-up match.

Spain training camp
The Philippine national team had a training camp in Spain where they played tune ups against the Democratic Republic of the Congo and the Ivory Coast in Guadalajara. After the two games they participated in a pocket tournament in Spain, which also involved the two African teams and the hosts. The Philippines won their games against their two African opponents prior to the tournament. The tournament in Malaga had the Philippines tie up with DR Congo and the Ivory Coast with Spain. The winner of the two ties contested in the final while the losers played for third place. The Philippines lost their second matchup against the DR Congo conceding an opportunity to play Spain which won over other African team in the pocket tournament.

11 players out of the 19-man shortlist participated in the Spain training camp with majority of the players missing out are from 2019 PBA Commissioner's Cup finalists TNT KaTropa and San Miguel Beermen. Raymond Almazan who had his visa application denied, Jordan Clarkson, Stanley Pringle who is nursing a slight ankle injury, did not join the camp. Kiefer Ravena while part of the 11 players participating did not play in any of the tune up matches against national teams due to serving a FIBA suspension which is due to end a week prior to the world cup.

Tune up matches at home
The first tune up game of the Philippine national team was against the 2019 William Jones Cup-bound local side Mighty Sports. Their game against the club ended in a draw with both teams scoring 85 points. The national team also had a scrimmage against the NLEX Road Warriors of the Philippine Basketball Association playing four 25-minute, first to 21-points games against the professional team. NLEX won the first set with the national team winning the next three sets.

Shortly before leaving for China, the national team had two tune-up matches against the Adelaide 36ers at the Meralco Gym in Pasig on August 23 and 25, 2019. The national team won 92–83 over the Adelaide-based professional team and conceded a 75–85 loss in the second game. Ravena after serving his 18-month FIBA suspension played in the second game.

Summary
Against local-based sides

Tune up matches in Spain

Malaga Tournament

Goodwill Games

Roster

The PBA has committed its players' participation in the FIBA Basketball World Cup. It was decided that the Philippines will field two separate teams for the intercontinental competition and the 2019 Southeast Asian Games, which the country will host. The SBP negotiated for FIBA's recognition of Jordan Clarkson of the Cleveland Cavaliers' eligibility to play as a "local player" rather than a "naturalized" player. Head coach Yeng Guiao decided not to include Clarkson in the final roster due to the absence of a FIBA decision that would allow him to play as a local player.

A training pool was formed from where the team's coaching staff selected players from. Players who were invited to the pool includes Robert Bolick, Gabe Norwood, June Mar Fajardo, Marcio Lassiter, Troy Rosario, Paul Lee, Raymond Almazan, Japeth Aguilar, CJ Perez, Kiefer Ravena, and Matthew Wright. Beau Belga and Stanley Pringle despite not being part of the pool also took part in training sessions. By June 5, 2019, no additional players are being invited to the pool.

A shortlist of 19 players was announced by  the national federation which includes Blatche, Clarkson, and Pringle who are considered naturalized players by FIBA. The final 12-man roster was officially announced to the public on August 25, 2019, after the second tune up game of the national team against the Adelaide 36ers, with Poy Erram, Matthew Wright and Marcio Lassiter not making into the final squad due to injuries. 2014 FIBA World Cup holdovers, Andray Blatche, June Mar Fajardo, and Japeth Aguilar are part of the roster.

The following were candidates to make the team: 

Jayson Castro who was not included in the training pool reportedly opted out in July 2019 from the national team's preparations due to undisclosed personal reasons.

Staff 

Age – describes age on 31 August 2019

Uniform

Supplier: Nike
Main sponsor: Smart Communications

Group phase

The Philippines was drawn into Group D with Serbia, Italy, and Angola and played all of its group phase matches in Foshan at the Foshan International Sports and Cultural Center from August 31 to September 4. The Philippine national team left Manila by plane for Guangzhou, China on August 29, 2019, and after arriving in the Guangdong province capital departed for Foshan via bus.

The Philippines hoped to progress to the next round with the tie against Italy and Angola tagged as crucial by head coach Yeng Guiao. Expectations of winning against Serbia was tempered but Guiao hoped for the team to win against Italy. Assuming the Philippines won over Italy and lose to Serbia, Guiao said that the Philippines had to win against Angola or the hypothetical win over Italy would have been rendered as "useless".

Guiao also sent his assistants Sandy Arespacochaga and Ford Arao to China ahead of the rest of the team and tasked them to do scouting on Serbia and Italy which played a tune up game against each other on August 23, 2019.

All times are local UTC+8.

Italy
This was the second game between the Philippines and Italy in the World Cup with the Italians winning on their first meeting in 1978. The two teams last played each other in the 2016 Imperial Basketball City Tournament as part of the Philippines' preparation for the 2016 FIBA World Olympic Qualifying Tournament where the Italians won over the Filipinos by 36 points.

The Philippines lost their opener 2019 FIBA Basketball World Cup game against Italy. The Philippines's opening campaign was marred by poor shooting performance with Filipinos only successfully executed three of the 23 three pointer attempts and the first three points made with 7:03 left in the fourth quarter. In contrast, the Italians accomplished 15 of their 31 three-pointer attempts and made 30 assists compared to 10 assists by the Filipinos. Philippines Head coach Yeng Guiao also concluded that team made too much turnovers.

The Philippines trailed heavily as early as the end of first quarter with the team only scoring 8 points compared to the 37 points made by the Italians.

Serbia
This was the first competitive game between Serbia and the Philippines.

Serbia had a slow start to the game and the Philippines tried to grow in the confidence. Tied at 7-all with six minutes left in the opening quarter, center Nikola Jokić came off the bench and the Serbian offense started to roll. The Serbs used a 7–0 run to close the first 10 minutes with a 25–13 lead. Forward Nemanja Bjelica came off the bench making all 7 of his field-goal attempts, including 3 three-pointers to finish with a game-high 20 points in just 16 minutes of action. Serbia not only out-rebounded Philippines 37–23, but they finished with 37 assists against Philippines' 14.

This is the game won by largest points margin at 59 for the Serbians at any of major tournaments since 2006. With 37 team assists Serbia set the World Cup record for the most assists in a single game.

Angola
This was the first competitive game between Angola and the Philippines.

Unlike in games against Italy and Serbia which ended in heavy defeats, the Philippines performed relatively better against Angola. While Angola lead throughout most of regulation time, the Philippines kept the gap to a manageable levels trailing 12 points at most. By the time when there was only 2:33 of time remaining in the fourth quarter, the Philippines were leading Angola 70–67. Angolan player Carlos Morais restored the Angolan lead rendering the scoreline 70–73. CJ Perez tied the game by scoring a three pointer but the Philippines failed to score further baskets forcing the game to go overtime. However the Philippines failed to secure the win in overtime.

Classification round

The Philippines finished last among four teams in Group C and was grouped with Angola, Iran and Tunisia in Group N in the classification round. The Philippines played games against the latter two in Beijing with the result of their loss to Angola carrying over. Had they progressed to the second round as one of the top two finishers of Group C, they would have played against Puerto Rico and Spain in Wuhan.

Tunisia
The Philippines' bid to qualify for the 2020 Summer Olympics as the best Asian team in the 2019 FIBA World Cup ended when Tunisia defeated them. Tunisia led the Philippines early with the first quarter ending in a 27–10 scoreline in favor of the North Africans.

Iran
The Philippines' last game in the 2019 FIBA Basketball World Cup is against Iran. The Philippines lost both of its two 2019 FIBA Basketball World Cup qualifier games to Iran; a 73–81 defeat in Tehran and a 70–78 loss at home in Pasay. Iran was coming off from a 71–62 win against Angola, their first in the tournament, and was still in contention for a berth at the 2020 Summer Olympics while the Philippines was looking to secure at least a win.

The Philippines kept the game close in the first quarter trailing only a point, 25–24, with 37.5 seconds left in the clock with its players successfully executing six of its eleven attempted three pointers. However the first quarter ended 30–24 in favor of Iran. CJ Perez restored the close gap of 34–31 in the second quarter but the first half ended in a 48–34 score still favoring Iran. Iran was leading the Philippines by 23 points, 64–41, with 4:10 left in the third quarter with the Philippines unable to restore at least a small gap in the scoreline. Mid-way in the fourth quarter Andray Blatche was fouled out after incurring two technical fouls after he argued with the referees regarding an alleged foul on him.

Aftermath
The Philippines ended their 2019 FIBA Basketball World Cup campaign without a win after playing five games, finishing dead last as a result of their poor performance. They also didn't manage to clinch the single outright Asian berth for the 2020 Summer Olympics by failing to finish as the best performing team from FIBA Asia with Iran, the Philippines' last opponent claiming the berth instead. The only route for the Philippines to qualify for the Summer Olympics is to get invited as one of the two Asian wildcard teams for the Olympic qualifying tournaments. An invite was not given, thus extending their drought in participation in the Olympic basketball tournament.

Head coach Yeng Guiao cited the lack of preparation as the reason for the Philippines' dismal performance in the world cup and reasoned that preparation should be started years prior to the tournament but added that the team did their best despite "limitations". He also suggested that the national team should gain more experience playing against teams outside Asia particularly European and Latin American teams.

Guiao eventually resigned as the team's head coach.

Tim Cone became the new head coach of the Philippines, who clinched the gold medal in the Men's basketball tournament of the 2019 Southeast Asian Games, which the country hosted. The team's gold medal victory contributed to the country's medal haul of 149 gold medals, out of the 387 medals won by the Philippines.

The Philippines is set to participate in the next edition of the World Cup in 2023, as one of the hosts. The team will also participate in the 2021 FIBA Asia Cup qualification.

See also 
 2019 Serbia FIBA Basketball World Cup team
 2019 United States FIBA Basketball World Cup team
 2019 Italy FIBA Basketball World Cup team

External links
Philippines team profile at the 2019 FIBA Basketball World Cup

References

Philippines at the FIBA Basketball World Cup
FIBA Basketball World Cup
Philippines